King Biscuit: Bachman–Turner Overdrive  is a live album recorded in Chicago on March 8, 1974, originally for broadcast on the King Biscuit Flower Hour.  King Biscuit Records released a remastered version in 2004 as part of the King Biscuit Archive Series with the title "Greatest Hits Live".

Track listing
"Let It Ride" (Randy Bachman, C.F. Turner)
"Give It Time" (C.F. Turner)
"Roll On down the Highway" (Robbie Bachman, C.F. Turner)
"Welcome Home" (Randy Bachman)
"Takin' Care of Business" (Randy Bachman)
"Slow Down Boogie" (Randy Bachman)
"You Ain't Seen Nothing Yet" (Randy Bachman) (bonus studio track; alternate take)
Interview

Personnel
Randy Bachman – lead guitar, lead vocals
C.F. Turner – bass, lead vocals
Tim Bachman – 2nd lead guitar, backing vocals
Robbie Bachman – drums

References

Bachman–Turner Overdrive live albums
1998 live albums